Pseudaeromonas sharmana is a Gram-negative and facultatively anaerobic bacterium from the genus of Pseudaeromonas which has been isolated from warm spring water from Jorhat, India.

References

External links
Type strain of Pseudaeromonas sharmana at BacDive -  the Bacterial Diversity Metadatabase

Aeromonadales
Bacteria described in 2006